The Civil Democratic Movement (also called the National Civil Movement) is a liberal political movement formed in Egypt in 2017.

The current alliance includes various parties that were also involved in the Civil Democratic Current; namely, the Constitution Party, the Dignity Party, Socialist Popular Alliance Party, Egyptian Social Democratic Party and the Bread and Freedom Party.

Affiliated parties
Numbers of seats in the 2020 parliament are shown in parentheses.
Bread and Freedom Party
Constitution Party
Dignity Party
Egyptian Social Democratic Party (first chamber:7 seats, second chamber:3 seats)
Freedom Egypt Party
Justice Party (first chamber:2 seats, second chamber:1 seats)
Reform and Development Misruna Party (first chamber:9 seats, second chamber:3 seats)
Socialist Popular Alliance Party

References

External links
Facebook Page

2017 establishments in Egypt
Egyptian democracy movements
Left-wing political party alliances
Organizations established in 2017
Political opposition organizations
Political party alliances in Egypt